The Reporter-Times is a newspaper based in Morgan County, Indiana, United States. It is headquartered in Martinsville.

History 
The Reporter-Times was founded as The Daily Reporter, in August 1889 by James G. Bain. James G Bain was the editor of the Morgan County Republican newspaper in 1870. The Morgan County Republican was founded by a group of local Republican Party leaders, which was initiated as a reaction to the Gazette's switch from the ranks of the Republican Party to that of the Democratic Party. In December, 1870, Bain and Henry Smock bought the paper, and Bain retained control of the journal after Smock departed in September, 1874. On November 19, 1874, the paper title was shortened to the Republican. In March 1889 the Republican publication frequency was changed to twice-weekly. In August, 1889 Bain acquired the Daily Reporter and transformed it to a daily edition of the Republican. The Republican was then changed back to a weekly publication. Bain had become the publisher for both journals: the Daily Reporter and the Republican. In July, 1892, Bain sold both the publication to Francis T. Singleton. Harry J. Martin purchased the journals in May, 1912, and sold them to the Reporter Publishing Company in 1946.  The company was led by Wilber L. Kendall, and his associates. They which decided to discontinue the Republican but, continued to publish the Daily Reporter. The Daily Reporter newspaper went through a series of name changes.  Its first official name was the Daily Reporter. It was later changed to the Martinsville Daily Reporter from 1946-1974. The paper then was changed to the Reporter from 1974-1999. In 1999 it changed its name to The Reporter-Times as it is known today. The Reporter times printed a letter from the assistant police chief which showed the racial insensitivity of the town but never printed their opinion on the letter.

Awards  
In 2010 the Reporter-Times donated to the Hoosier State Press Associate Foundation (HSPA). In 2018 the Hoosier State Press Associate (HSPA) hosted a “Better Newspaper Contest Awards.” The Reporter-Times current Managing Editor Stephen Crane won 2nd place in division 3 category of Best Portrait “A day of healing.” The Reporter-Times current sports editor, Steve Page also placed 2nd place in division 3 category of Best Sports News Or Feature Coverage “Strietelmeier diving through her battle with cancer.”

References 

Companies based in Indiana
National newspapers published in the United States
Newspapers established in 1889
Daily newspapers published in the United States
1889 establishments in Indiana